Mariany Mayumi Nonaka (born 22 February 1988) is a Brazilian table tennis player. As of March 2012, Nonaka is ranked no. 406 in the world by the International Table Tennis Federation (ITTF). She is a member of Acrepa Sao Bernardo Sports Club, and is coached and trained by Mauricio Kobayashi. Nonaka is also right-handed, and uses the attacking, shakehand grip.

Nonaka made her official debut, as a 16-year-old, at the 2004 Summer Olympics in Athens, where she competed only in the women's doubles. Playing with her partner Lígia Silva, Nonaka received a bye for the first round, before losing out to the Czech duo, Renáta Štrbíková and Alena Vachovcová, with a set score of 2–4.

Four years after competing in her first Olympics, Nonaka qualified for her second Brazilian team, as a 20-year-old and a lone female table tennis player, at the 2008 Summer Olympics in Beijing, by receiving a spot from the Latin American Qualification Tournament in Santo Domingo, Dominican Republic. She lost the preliminary round match of the women's singles to Lithuania's Rūta Paškauskienė, with a unanimous set score of 0–4.

References

External links
 
 
 Profile – UOL Esporte 
 NBC Olympics Profile

1988 births
Living people
Brazilian female table tennis players
Brazilian people of Japanese descent
Table tennis players at the 2004 Summer Olympics
Table tennis players at the 2008 Summer Olympics
Olympic table tennis players of Brazil
Sportspeople from São Paulo
South American Games gold medalists for Brazil
South American Games bronze medalists for Brazil
South American Games medalists in table tennis
Competitors at the 2006 South American Games